This is a list of the National Register of Historic Places listings in Nelson County, Kentucky.

This is intended to be a complete list of the properties and districts on the National Register of Historic Places in Nelson County, Kentucky, United States. The locations of National Register properties and districts for which the latitude and longitude coordinates are included below, may be seen in a Google map.

There are 41 properties and districts listed on the National Register in the county.

Current listings

|}

See also

 List of National Historic Landmarks in Kentucky
 National Register of Historic Places listings in Kentucky
 List of attractions and events in the Louisville metropolitan area

References

Nelson County, National Register
Nelson